Ginger garlic masala is a crushed mixture of raw ginger and garlic cloves.

Optionally, salt is added to the ginger garlic paste while crushing.

This compounded mixture is often used in Indian curries and vegetable dishes in many parts of India. It is also used in Thai cuisine.

The mixture has some beneficial properties and also enhances the taste and flavour of the dish it is added to. Ginger is especially well known for its digestive properties.

Ideally, the paste or masala should be freshly prepared using a grindstone. However, due to scarcity of time and unavailability of a grindstone, people may use a mixer-grinder appliance to prepare the paste. These days, the paste is also available as a readymade preserve in many departmental stores or groceries.

See also
 List of garlic dishes

References

External links
 Vivek Singh's Ginger-and-garlic-paste-recipe
 Atul Kochhar's Ginger-and-garlic-paste-recipe 
 Preserving Ginger Garlic Paste

Indian cuisine
Thai cuisine
Garlic dishes
Food paste
Ginger dishes